Liberty Towers may refer to:

Liberty Towers (Tulsa) – in Tulsa, Oklahoma
Liberty Towers (Jersey City) – in Jersey City, New Jersey
 Liberty Place in Philadelphia, Pennsylvania